Edward Burt may refer to:

 Edmund Burt (died 1755), also known as Edward, Scottish military figure, engineer and author
 Edward Angus Burt (1859–1939), American mycologist
 Edward David Burt (born c. 1979), Premier of Bermuda